Munno Para is a northern suburb of Adelaide, South Australia. It is located in the City of Playford.

In the local Kaurna dialect, Munno Para means golden wattle creek. The name refers to either the Gawler River (which starts at the confluence of the South Para River and North Para River) or the Little Para River from which the much larger cadastral Hundred of Munno Para derives its name.

History
Until 1997, Munno Para was part of the City of Munno Para, formerly the district councils of Munno Para East and Munno Para West which were established in 1853 and 1854 on land bounded by the cadastral Hundred of Munno Para. The older part of the suburb itself began from a subdivision in 1955 and the suburb was named in 1978. Until the locality was urbanised from 1955, Munno Para was part of the farming district north of the township of Smithfield. The Andrews Family farmed most of the area west of the Gawler Central Railway Line and what is now Stebonheath Road.

The Playford Alive development began in the 2000s, establishing urban development in Munno Para to the west of the railway line, centred initially on Coventry Road, then establishing a new "Playford Town Centre" with shops and commercial development along a redeveloped Curtis Road and Peachey Road extended north of Curtis Road into the suburb.

Geography
The suburb lies northeast of Elizabeth and Smithfield. The original part of Munno Para is basically rectangular in shape, lying lengthwise between the Gawler railway line and Main North Road. More recent development on the western side of the railway line is also in the suburb of Munno Para. The entire suburb is fairly flat, sloping slightly down to the west and south.

The only road across the railway line in Munno Para is Curtis Road along the southern boundary of the suburb. Pedestrians can also cross at the Munno Para railway station. Main North Road runs along the eastern boundary, Stebonheath Road along the western boundary. Coventry Road historically was parallel and halfway between these two, however the suburban development has introduced some bends for traffic calming on this route.

Demographics

The 2006 Census by the Australian Bureau of Statistics counted 1,754 persons in Munno Para on census night. Of these, 49.2% were male and 50.8% were female.

The majority of residents (74.7%) are of Australian birth, with 12.9% declaring England as their country of birth.

The average age of Munno Para residents is slightly lower than the greater Australian population. 60.4% of residents were over 25 years in 2006, compared to the Australian average of 66.5%; and 39.6% were younger than 25 years, compared to the Australian average of 33.5%.

Community
The local newspaper is the News Review Messenger. Other regional and national newspapers such as The Advertiser and The Australian are also available.

Schools
Munno Para Primary School is located near the centre of the original part of the suburb. Mark Oliphant College and Adelaide North Special School are in the northern part of the newer area.

Attractions

Parks
There is greenspace throughout the residential areas of the suburb. The older part is designed with a linear park through the middle of the long axis. The newer part has landscaped wetlands along Curtis Road near Douglas Drive (formerly Coventry Road) and near Stebonheath Road. These wetlands calm and treat stormwater before releasing it into Smith Creek. The North Lakes golf course is in the northwestern corner.

Transportation

Roads
Munno Para is serviced by Main North Road, linking the suburb to Gawler, Elizabeth and Salisbury.

Public transport
Munno Para is serviced by buses run by the Adelaide Metro. The suburb also lies astride the Gawler railway line, being serviced at Munno Para railway station.

Bicycle routes
A bicycle path extends through parklands through the middle of the original part of the suburb.

See also
List of Adelaide suburbs
Hundred of Munno Para

References

External links
City of Playford
Local Government Association of SA – City of Playford
2006 ABS Census Data by Location

Suburbs of Adelaide